Ready Steady Cook is a BBC daytime TV cooking game show. It debuted on 24 October 1994 and the last original edition was broadcast on 2 February 2010. The programme was hosted by Fern Britton from 1994 until 2000 when celebrity chef Ainsley Harriott became the new host. In August 2000, when Harriott took over, the duration of the programme was extended from 30 to 45 minutes.

On 2 September 2019, it was confirmed that Rylan Clark-Neal would host a revived daytime series on BBC One in 2020. On 7 September 2021, it was announced by the BBC that the series ended after two series.

Format

Ingredients
Two members of the public provided two celebrity chefs with a bag of ingredients they had bought, usually to a set budget of £5. Essential ingredients such as Bread, Milk, Eggs etc. are provided by the show. The two teams were designated "red tomato" and "green pepper" (referred to as "red kitchen" and "green kitchen" after the August 2007 revamp, though the tomato and pepper motifs still featured on the guests' aprons and in the show's logo).

Occasionally, the permitted budget was increased: a so-called Bistro Bag allowed for ingredients of up to £7.50, while the Gourmet Bag could have a value of up to £10. On some occasions, they used a £3.50 Budget Bag. Also on a few shows, a Lucky Dip Bag was used, which contained ten items. The chef closed their eyes and picked out half of the items at the beginning. At the halfway mark, the chef randomly picked a sixth item, which might have helped or hindered the chef. The chefs had no prior knowledge of the ingredients they had to prepare. Another format was used on occasion in which both kitchens were given the same ingredients, and the toss of a red and green die determined who had first pick.

The Main Course
The chefs had to make several dishes out of the said ingredients in 20 minutes, with the help of the contestants and the programme host. As the contestants taste the prepared food, the host asks the chef some questions about their dish. Prior to the September 2006 season it was customary for the chefs to name their creations, which usually included a pun.

The preparations were voted on by the studio audience, who each held up a card showing either a red tomato or green pepper. In the newer episodes, the audience members pushed a button on their seat keypad to indicate who they would like to win. The winner received a cash prize of £100, which celebrity guests donated to charity (an example the regular guests sometimes followed) but this was changed to a plate towards the end of the series. The runner-up used to receive a hamper which included a variety of items, such as a set of knives, pasta and sauces, olive oil and balsamic vinegar but later received a Ready Steady Cook mug due to budget restraints.

Quickie bag
The quickie bag section of the show then followed. This was introduced in 2000, the same year Ainsley Harriott became presenter, extending the programme from 30 to 45 minutes. The contents of the quickie bag used to be decided on by the series producer and a home economist. Their decision was based on produce that was currently in season or unusual ingredients that had not featured on the show recently. In late August 2007, the quickie bag changed format with the bag being brought in by George Edward Mcauliffe, who challenged the chefs to prepare the dish.

The two chefs each had a chance to describe what they would cook using the bag of ingredients and the audience members voted to choose which dish they would like to see prepared. The winner then had 10 minutes to complete the described dishes, with the help of the other chef and Ainsley. The hectic preparation of the chosen chef's suggested dishes often includes a slight element of chaos and ad-libbing along the way. A viewer's question relating to a cooking problem is usually put to the chefs, further adding to the pressure upon them to complete their dishes in the time allowed.

Variations on the format
 Classic Bag – The original format where the contestant brought in a bag of ingredients costing up to £5.
 Budget Bag – Similar to the 'Classic Bag' but the ingredients could only cost up to £3.50.
 Bistro Bag – Ingredients worth £7.50.
 Gourmet Bag – Worth £10.
 Doubling Up Bag – Both contestants bring in the same ingredients. The host used a coin or die with a Green Pepper and Red Tomato on to decide which chef would decide what to do with the ingredients first. The other chef must do something different.
 Forfeit Bag – The chefs had to choose a card at random with a forfeit which prohibited their use of a certain store cupboard ingredient such as No Fresh Herbs, No Spices, No Citrus or No Wine.
 Gamble Bag – The chefs were presented with three mystery ingredients and are given the opportunity to swap one of their ingredients with one of these mystery ingredients. They do not have to swap but if they do, they cannot change their minds once the new ingredient is revealed.
 Lucky Dip – The Chefs were presented with a bag of ten items from which they had to pick five at random. After 10 minutes had passed, they then chose a sixth ingredient, which depending on what the chef has started cooking, can help or hinder them.

Celebrity Ready Steady Cook
Originally as a spin-off that ran alongside the original, Celebrity Ready Steady Cook had celebrities, often competing against a family member or friend, provide the bag of ingredients to the same budget of £5. Later series would see the public completely replaced with celebrity guests.

Celebrity appearances include: David Tennant, Wendy Richard, Kate Winslet, Honor Blackman, James May, Richard Hammond, Paul O'Grady as alter-ego Lily Savage, Cliff Richard, Twiggy, Rakie Ayola, Fiona Bruce, Gail Porter, Midge Ure, Edd China, Amanda Redman, Ade Edmondson and Alan Davies.

Featured chefs
Original version:

 Ross Burden
 Gino D'Acampo
 Garrey Dawson
 James Martin
 Nick Nairn
 Paul Rankin
 James Tanner
 Tony Tobin
 Brian Turner
 Phil Vickery
 Lesley Waters
 Kevin Woodford
 Antony Worrall Thompson

Revived series
In September 2019, the BBC announced that Ready Steady Cook would return.

Returning in March 2020, Celebrity MasterChef finalist Rylan Clark-Neal serves as host. He is joined by chefs Ellis Barrie, Romy Gill, Anna Haugh, Akis Petretzikis, and Mike Reid.

Ready Steady Cook introduced various sustainability efforts, including favouring glass over plastic, initiating a recycling programme, donating leftover food to a local food bank, and using locally sourced seasonal ingredients and Fair Trade items when available.

The second series following the revival started airing in March 2021. Clark-Neal returned as host, with the chef team largely remaining the same. Jeremy Pang replaced Mike Reid as Reid was unable to return to the UK from Australia during the pandemic. For the first time, the chefs decided the winner as the show was filmed without an audience.

Series overview

Original series

Revived series

Celebrity Ready Steady Cook

Specials

Daytime Celebrity Christmas specials

International versions

Books

References

External links
 
 Ready Steady Cook (2020 revival)
 
 
 Ready Steady Cook at BFI
 
 Celebrity Ready Steady Cook at BFI

1994 British television series debuts
2021 British television series endings
1990s British cooking television series
2000s British cooking television series
2010s British cooking television series
2020s British cooking television series
1990s British game shows
2000s British game shows
2010s British game shows
2020s British game shows
BBC television game shows
British cooking television shows
British television series revived after cancellation
Cooking competitions in the United Kingdom
English-language television shows
Television series by Banijay